"Go to War" is a song by American rock band Nothing More. It was released on June 23, 2017 as the first single off of the band's fifth album The Stories We Tell Ourselves. The song performed well commercially and critically, topping the Billboard Mainstream Rock chart and receiving two Grammy Award nominations Best Rock Song and Best Rock Performance, for the 2018 Grammys.

Background
Contrary to the band normal process for song writing, where song ideas are written and tweaked for months until they are finalized, "Go to War" was written in a span of around 30 minutes, with lyrics improvised on the spot. Hawkins, the band's primary writer, explained: 

The song was released as the first single off from The Stories We Tell Ourselves first released on June 23, 2017, alongside promotional single "Don't Stop" and lyric videos for both tracks. A full-fledged music video was recorded on June 1, at the Lacy St. Production Center in Los Angeles, and later released on June 26. The music video takes place in bar, and consists of alternating footage of the band performing, and bar verbally and physically fighting one another. In July, the song was also played for television commercials for the film War for the Planet of the Apes. The song was additionally used in a trailer for the video game Paladins. An alternate, acoustic recording song was released for streaming on the internet as well.

Themes and composition
Lyrically, the song's theme is related to the concept of trust. Frontman Jonny Hawkins explained, "Trust is the foundation of every relationship. As trust erodes, our need for control grows. 'Go To War' is about how we circle the problem, unknowingly spinning the web tighter. If you circle enough, it becomes a spiral. If you spiral enough, it becomes a war."
 Hawkins also stated that the song was inspired from a particularly negative conversation he had after getting a divorce. Billboard interpreted the song to be about how people "aim to score points instead of resolve conflicts".

Musically, the song has been described as "percussion-heavy" with a "Depeche Mode-esque beat" and "hammered down guitar licks. Loudwire described Hawkin's vocals as possessing a quite-loud dynamic, alternating from a "restrained vulnerable" and a "primal catharsis" sound that captured the early stages of a "relationship gone wrong".

Reception
The song performed well commercially and critically. It topped the Billboard US Mainstream Rock Songs chart in November 2017, the band's first song to do so. It also received multiple nominations for best rock song in 2017. It received two Grammy Award nominations Best Rock Song and Best Rock Performance, for the 2018 Grammys. It additionally received a nomination for "Best Rock Song" for the iHeartRadio Music Awards. The song was also strongly praised by rock and metal music website Loudwire, who named it one of their top songs of 2017, and nominated for top hard rock song of the year for their Loudwire Music Awards. It did not win the award, but was still named Loudwire's staff pick for best hard rock song of 2017. The song also fared well with Loudwire's readers/listener's with the website's "Cage Match" voting polls, with it being put into its "Hall of Fame" due to winning the vote five times in a row, including winning over The Foo Fighters "Run", Highly Suspect's "Little One", Greta Van Fleet's "Highway Tune", Prophets of Rage's "Living on the 110", and Skillet's "The Resistance".

Track listing

Personnel 
 Jonny Hawkins – lead vocals
 Daniel Oliver – bass, keyboards, backing vocals
 Mark Vollelunga – guitar, backing vocals
 Ben Anderson – drums

Charts

References

	

2017 songs
Nothing More songs
Eleven Seven Label Group singles
Music videos directed by Wayne Isham
Songs written by David Pramik